Leon Clore (9 July 19189 February 1992) was a British film producer who was primarily involved in documentary and short films, as well as several motion pictures.

Biography 
Leon Clore was born in Brighton on 9 July 1918. He was the nephew of Sir Charles Clore, whose foundation enabled the Tate Gallery, via the Clore Gallery, to adequately present the William Turner estate.

Clore's film career began as the first assistant director for the British film The Silver Darlings in 1947. Up to 1951, Clore worked for the Crown Film Unit before taking charge of Basic Films. He first worked as a film producer in 1951, and was responsible for the documentary short film  Sunday by the Sea. His documentary The Conquest of Everest was nominated for an Academy Award for Best Documentary Feature.

Clore produced the romantic film Virgin Island (1958), directed by Pat Jackson and starring John Cassavetes and Sidney Poitier; Morgan – A Suitable Case for Treatment (1966) starring David Warner and Vanessa Redgrave, the Karel Reisz directed David Mercer comedy;  All Neat in Black Stockings (1969) with Victor Henry in the leading role; and The French Lieutenant's Woman (1981) directed by Karel Reisz, starring Meryl Streep and Jeremy Irons. He produced a number of advertisements.

His last involvement in the film business was in the documentary short "Your Degree and the Royal Navy?" in 1986.

Clore died at Hammersmith Hospital in London, where he was being treated for cancer, on 9 February 1992 at the age of 73. Clore's son G. Marius Clore FRS became a biophysicist.

Selected filmography 
 1951: Sunday by the Sea , documentary short film)
 1953: The Conquest of Everest
 1957: Apaches
 1957: Time Without Pity
 1958: Virgin Island (US: Our Virgin Island)
 1966: Morgan – A Suitable Case for Treatment
 1969: All Neat in Black Stockings
 1981: The French Lieutenant’s Woman (film)
 1986: Your Degree and the Royal Navy? (Documentary short)

References

External links 
 

1918 births
1992 deaths
British documentary filmmakers
British film producers
Deaths from cancer in England